Decalepidanthus is a genus of flowering plants belonging to the family Boraginaceae.

Its native range is Afghanistan to Central Asia and Nepal.

Species:

Decalepidanthus echioides 
Decalepidanthus elongatus 
Decalepidanthus flavescens 
Decalepidanthus moltkioides 
Decalepidanthus parviflorus 
Decalepidanthus primuloides 
Decalepidanthus racemosus 
Decalepidanthus rosulatus 
Decalepidanthus trollii

References

Boraginoideae
Boraginaceae genera